Port Meadow is a large meadow of open common land beside the River Thames to the north and west of Oxford, England.

Overview
The meadow is an ancient area of grazing land, still used for horses and cattle, and according to legend has never been ploughed, at least for around 4,000 years. The Freemen's collective right to graze their animals free of charge is recorded in the Domesday Book of 1086 and has been exercised ever since.

The meadow runs from Jericho to Wolvercote (where north of the Shiplake Ditch it becomes Wolvercote Common) along the east (left) bank of the River Thames, with the Cotswold Line railway, the Oxford Canal and the suburb of North Oxford further to the east, and the village of Binsey to the west. Access to Port Meadow is via Walton Well Road or Aristotle Lane in the south (or from the south via Roger Dudman Way or the Thames Path) or from Godstow Road, Wolvercote via Wolvercote Common in the north. It is a typical English flood-meadow and is a favourite area for walking, with easy access from the city of Oxford. It is also a Site of Special Scientific Interest. At the southern end of the meadow is Fiddler's Island in the River Thames. In the winter the meadow sometimes floods; if frozen it forms a huge and relatively safe area for skating. In late spring vast areas are carpeted with buttercups. Horses, cattle and geese graze the meadow and many birds can often be seen.

At the eastern edge of Port Meadow, just north of the entrance from Aristotle Lane, is Burgess Field, a reclaimed landfill site and home to a nature reserve, managed by Oxford City Council.

Port Meadow is one of the most popular locations in Oxford for recreation activities such as walking, running, cycling and swimming in the adjacent River Thames. During days of fair weather the banks of the River Thames in the Meadow are often lined with people enjoying the natural environs. The meadow is also popular with photographers and bird-watchers.

History

The River Thames (known as the Isis in this area) flows past this large grazing meadow. This is where the Reverend Charles Lutwidge Dodgson (Lewis Carroll) and the Reverend Robinson Duckworth rowed up the river on 4 July 1862 with three young girls — Lorina, Alice, and Edith Liddell. While journeying slowly from Folly Bridge to near Godstow, Dodgson began at their request to make up a story that later was expanded into Alice's Adventures in Wonderland.

Because the meadow appears never to have been ploughed, it contains well-preserved archaeological remains, some of which survive as residual earthworks. Of particular note are several Bronze Age round barrows, an area of Iron Age settlement, and the foundations of 17th-century fortifications from the Parliamentary siege of Oxford during the English Civil War.

In the 17th and 18th centuries, the meadow was used for horse racing, and low stone bridges laid over washes and ditches for this purpose still survive.

During the First World War part of Port Meadow was used to train the Royal Flying Corps and turned into a military aerodrome. Fifteen air crew and pilots were killed flying from Port Meadow or close by. In 1940, during the Second World War, a camp was set up on the meadow for military personnel evacuated from Dunkirk.

In the 1980s and 1990s, the meadow was known as a location for free festivals and raves.

Just across the Thames is Bossoms Boatyard, with a small marina and Medley Footbridge across the Thames. The Medley Sailing Club, the furthest upstream sailing club on the River Thames, is on the western bank. To the south is the start of the Castle Mill Stream and Cripley Meadow, largely consisting of allotments.

Development

From 2012, the Oxford University Estates Directorate, with the help of Longcross, have been developing the one-hectare Castle Mill site (400 m × 25 m) between the Cripley Meadow Allotments and the railway tracks, close to the southern end of Port Meadow, as extensive student accommodation.
The development was controversial, since the four to five storey blocks overlook Port Meadow. Campaigners warned of damage to views of Oxford. There has been an online petition and a "Save Port Meadow" campaign was established in December 2012. Concerns were raised by the Oxford Preservation Trust and the Green Party. Anger was caused even among members of Oxford University. The development was likened to building a "skyscraper beside Stonehenge". In February 2013, Oxford City Council entered negotiations with Oxford University to reduce the height of the buildings by two storeys. On 7 May 2013, the Campaign to Protect Rural England applied to the High Court for judicial review of the decision to grant planning permission on the grounds that requirements for a full Environmental Impact Assessment (EIA) were not met.

In 2016, Oxford University proposed an array of mitigating techniques, including cladding and horizontal beams to "break up the vertical façade". Later, changes were made to the buildings in an attempt to reduce their visual impact.

See also
 , a former railway station on the Varsity Line
 Burgess Field Nature Park, to the east
 Cripley Meadow, to the south
 Trap Ground Allotments, to the east
 Wolvercote Common, to the north
 Binsey Poplars, an 1879 poem by Gerard Manley Hopkins (1844–1889), written after the felling of a row of poplar trees on the River Thames overlooking Port Meadow

References

External links
 

Areas of Oxford
Parks and open spaces in Oxfordshire
Parks and open spaces in Oxford
Sites of Special Scientific Interest in Oxfordshire
Water-meadows
Grasslands of the United Kingdom
Parks and open spaces on the River Thames
Common land in England
Meadows in Oxfordshire